The Canada women's national soccer team has represented Canada at seven of the eight stagings of the FIFA Women's World Cup. The inaugural tournament in 1991 was the only edition for which they failed to qualify.

Overall record

Record by opponent

1995 FIFA Women's World Cup

Group B

1999 FIFA Women's World Cup

Group C

2003 FIFA Women's World Cup

Group C

Quarterfinals

Semifinals

Third place match

2007 FIFA Women's World Cup

Group C

2011 FIFA Women's World Cup

Group A

2015 FIFA Women's World Cup

Group A

Round of 16

Quarterfinals

2019 FIFA Women's World Cup

Group E

Round of 16

2023 FIFA Women's World Cup

Group B

Goalscorers

References

 
World Cup
Countries at the FIFA Women's World Cup